Stefania Liberakakis (born 17 December 2002), known simply as Stefania, is a Greek-Dutch singer, voice actress and YouTuber. She is a former member of the girl group Kisses, which represented the Netherlands in the Junior Eurovision Song Contest 2016. In 2020, she was internally selected to represent Greece in the Eurovision Song Contest 2020 with the song "Supergirl", but this edition of the contest was later cancelled due to the COVID-19 pandemic. The Greek broadcaster ERT decided that Liberakakis would represent Greece in the 2021 contest, this time with the song "Last Dance", with which she finished in tenth place.

Career

Early career 
In 2013, Liberakakis was a contestant in the third season of The Voice Kids in the Netherlands. She joined Team Borsato after her blind audition, but was eliminated in the battle rounds. She then joined the children's choir Kinderen voor Kinderen, which she left after two years.

2016: Junior Eurovision Song Contest 

In 2016, Liberakakis auditioned for Junior Songfestival, the Dutch preselection for the Junior Eurovision Song Contest. She was internally chosen to represent the Netherlands in the Junior Eurovision Song Contest 2016 in Valletta as part of the girl group Kisses. The group performed the song "Kisses and Dancin'" and placed 8th out of 17 entries.

2017–2019: Solo career and acting 
In 2018, Liberakakis released her first solo single named "Stupid Reasons". In 2019, she released three more singles: "Wonder", "I'm Sorry (Whoops!)" and "Turn Around". In June 2019, she performed a cover of the song "Con Calma" (together with Konnie Metaxa and Ilenia Williams) at the MAD Video Music Awards, which was broadcast on Greek television.

From 2018 onwards, she stars as Fenna in the TV-series Brugklas (English: The First Years). She also starred in the Dutch movies Brugklas: De tijd van m'n leven, De Club van Lelijke Kinderen (as singer) and 100% Coco New York (as Lilly).

Eurovision Song Contest 2020 and 2021 

In late 2019, Liberakakis was named as a potential candidate to represent Greece in the Eurovision Song Contest 2020 to be held in Rotterdam, the Netherlands. On 3 February 2020, it was confirmed by broadcaster ERT that she had indeed been selected to succeed Katerine Duska as the Greek representative. She would have performed the song "Supergirl" in the second semi-final on 14 May 2020. However, on 18 March, the EBU announced the cancellation of the contest due to COVID-19 pandemic. On the same day, ERT announced that Greece will participate in the Eurovision Song Contest 2021, with Stefania as the country's representative.

In the 2021 Contest, Stefania participated with the song "Last Dance", which was released on 10 March 2021. She performed the song in the second semi-final, in which she also qualified for the final, on 20 May 2021. Stefania was accompanied on stage by dancers George Papadopoulos, Nikos Koukakis, Markos Giakoumoglou and Costas Pavlopoulos, while Fokas Evangelinos was the choreographer and the artistic director of the entry. Stefania performed in the final of the Eurovision Song Contest 2021, where she finished in 10th place.

Personal life
She was born to Greek parents, Koula and Spyros Liberakakis, in Utrecht, Netherlands. Her family originates from Thourio and Sofiko, small villages in Evros, Greece. She is niece of the Greek actor Yannis Stankoglou.

Discography

Singles

As lead artist

As part of Kisses

Filmography

Television

Film

References

External links 

 Official website
 YouTube channel
 

2002 births
Living people
Musicians from Utrecht (city)
Greek women singers
Greek actresses
Greek voice actresses
Dutch women singers
Dutch actresses
Dutch voice actresses
Dutch YouTubers
Junior Eurovision Song Contest entrants for the Netherlands
Eurovision Song Contest entrants for Greece
Eurovision Song Contest entrants of 2020
Eurovision Song Contest entrants of 2021
The Voice Kids contestants
Modern Greek-language singers
Dutch people of Greek descent